Li Jianhua may refer to:

Li Jianhua (politician)
Li Jianhua (diplomat)
Li Jianhua (footballer)